Cooksonia is a genus of butterflies in the family Lycaenidae first described by Hamilton Herbert Druce in 1905. Cooksonia is endemic to the Afrotropical realm.

Etymology
The genus name honours Harold Cookson (1876-1969), a farmer and amateur zoologist who lived in Muden, Natal, and later in the Vumba Mountains in what was then Rhodesia.

Species
Cooksonia abri Collins & Larsen, 2008
Cooksonia aliciae Talbot, 1935
Cooksonia ginettae Collins & Larsen, 2008
Cooksonia neavei (H. H. Druce, 1912)
Cooksonia trimeni H. H. Druce, 1905

References

Poritiinae
Lycaenidae genera
Taxa named by Hamilton Herbert Druce